Bad Hindelang is a municipality in the district of Oberallgäu in Bavaria in Germany. As of 2008 it has a population of 4,915. Its sulphur spring was used for cures in the 19th century and today the municipality is a major health resort.

Geography
The main town of Bad Hindelang lies at an altitude of 825 metres above sea level. The municipality includes the following areas, Bad Hindelang, Vorderhindelang, Bad Oberdorf, Hinterstein, Oberjoch and Unterjoch.

Landscape

The town hall is a former hunting lodge, built in 1660 by Prince Bishop of Augsburg, Sigismund Franz, Archduke of Tyrol. It was used as a summer residence by the prince bishops of Augsburg until 1805. After the secularization of the palace went over to the state, it then fell into private ownership as a guest house and schoolhouse, until it finally became the town hall of the municipality. It still has an early baroque rococo fireplace.

The church of St. Jodokus in Bad Oberdorf was built in 1937-38 by Thomas Wechs to replace the old church but the present church contains several valuable pieces including a 1493 Byzantine style depiction of Madonna and Child and a 1519 carving on the altar by Jörg Lederer. There is a gothic life-size depiction of Christ on a donkey on Palm Sunday. Other panel paintings and statues of saints complete the facilities of the church.

The Evangelical Church  is located on the banks of the Ostrach River and was established in 1628. The first wooden chapel was dedicated to St. Michael, but was destroyed by a storm on 18 January 1739. In 1748, a stone building was subsequently completed. On 30 October 1748 it was consecrated the chapel as Trinity Chapel. The altar of Jörg Lederer was one located in this chapel but was moved to St. Jodokus church in 1937.

Bad Oberdorf contains the Friedenshistorisches Museum and the Hinterstein Carriage Museum which has numerous displays related to carriages and wax models. It also contains the Upper Mill estate which dates back to 1433 and is now run as a museum and hotel. It contains a number of items related to Bad Hindelang's cultural heritage and old costumes of the millers etc. Also of note is the Dreikugelhaus in Bad Hindelang, built in 1671. The original owner was the salt merchant Thomas Scholl.

Mayors
1900-1919:  Josef Anton Blanz
1920-1933:  Michael Haas
1933-1939:  Anton Schmid
1939-1945:  Karl Blanz
1945-1947:  Max Zillibiller, CSU
1947-1948:  Xaver Blenk
1948-1960:  Alois Haug
1960-1984:  Georg Scholl, CSU
1984-2008:  Roman Haug, Freie Wähler
2008–2018: Adalbert Martin, CSU
2018–present: Sabine Rödel

Notable people

Sepp Rist (1900–1980)
Michael Bredl (1916–1999)
Clemens Wenzeslaus (1739–1812)
Pamela Behr, (born 1956)
Hans-Peter Lanig (1935-2022)
Horst Zuse (born 1945)
Klaus Hulek (born 1952)

Photo gallery

Bibliography 
 Wolfgang B. Kleiner/Martin Kluger: Bad Hindelang im Allgäu. Bayerns zauberhafter Süden. context medien und verlag, Augsburg 2009,

References

External links

Official website

Oberallgäu
Spa towns in Germany